Nicktoons is a children’s Arab pay television channel broadcasting to the Middle East & North Africa. Nicktoons was launched on 15 February 2017 and uses the UK version's on-air broadcast graphic package produced by Beautiful Creative. The channel is available on OSN.

Shows
Some of the shows:

The Barbarian and the Troll
SpongeBob SquarePants
The Patrick Star Show
El Tigre: The Adventures of Manny Rivera
Kamp Koral: SpongeBob's Under Years
The Fairly OddParents
It's Pony
Middlemost Post
Harvey Beaks
The Loud House
The Casagrandes
The X's
Bunsen Is a Beast
Welcome to the Wayne
Teenage Mutant Ninja Turtles
Rise of the Teenage Mutant Ninja Turtles
ALVINNN!!! and the Chipmunks
Rugrats
Rugrats
Deer Squad
Dorg Van Dango
The Wild Thornberrys
As Told by Ginger
Hey Arnold!
CatDog
Kappa Mikey
The Adventures of Jimmy Neutron: Boy Genius
Danny Phantom
Catscratch
ChalkZone
My Life as a Teenage Robot
Avatar: The Legend of Aang
The Legend of Korra
Rainbow Butterfly Unicorn Kitty
The Penguins of Madagascar
Breadwinners
The Smurfs
The Adventures of Kid Danger
Sanjay and Craig
Kung Fu Panda: Legends of Awesomeness

References

Arabic-language television stations
Children's television networks
Television channels and stations established in 2017
Television stations in the United Arab Emirates
Television stations in Saudi Arabia
Television stations in Egypt
Television stations in Lebanon
Television stations in Iraq
Television channels in Jordan
Television stations in Libya
Television stations in Algeria
Television stations in the State of Palestine
Television stations in Tunisia
Television stations in Kuwait
Television stations in Morocco
Television stations in Yemen
Television channels in Syria
Television channels in Mauritania